Mark Dalbey is the former President of Covenant Theological Seminary in St. Louis, Missouri, the denominational seminary of the Presbyterian Church in America. He was appointed Vice President of Academics in 2009, prior to which, he served as the Dean of Students for ten years.  He began teaching at Covenant in 1999 as an Assistant Professor of Practical Theology, following almost twenty years in ordained pastoral ministry. Dalbey has a BA in Philosophy and Religion from Tarkio College, an M.Div. from Pittsburgh Theological Seminary, and a D.Min. from Covenant Theological Seminary. Dalbey previously served as a pastor in Cincinnati, Ohio, and taught at Geneva College, Pennsylvania.

Head of Covenant Theological Seminary 
As of April 28, 2012, Dalbey was the Acting President of Covenant Theological Seminary, when his office announced of decisions by the Board of Trustees, that Dr Bryan Chapell, current President of Covenant Seminary, will be transitioning from sabbatical to the newly created position of Chancellor, and Dr. Dalbey will assume the position of Interim President. On September 26, 2013, Dalbey was inaugurated as President. He served as president until June 30, 2021.

References 

Living people
Covenant Theological Seminary alumni
Covenant Theological Seminary faculty
Pittsburgh Theological Seminary alumni
Presidents of Calvinist and Reformed seminaries
Geneva College faculty
Year of birth missing (living people)